Incident in San Francisco is a 1971 American thriller television film directed by Don Medford that aired on ABC. It stars  Richard Kiley, Leslie Nielsen and Dean Jagger.

Cast
Richard Kiley as Robert Harmon
Leslie Nielsen as Lt. Brubaker
Dean Jagger as Sam Baldwin
John Marley as Mario Cianelli
Tim O'Connor as Arthur Andrews
Phyllis Thaxter as Lois Harmon
Ruth Roman as Sophia Cianelli
David Opatoshu as Herschel Roman
Claudia McNeil as Odessa Carter
Tracy Reed as Penny Carter
Julius Harris as Henry Carter
Tom Nardini as Alfred Cianelli
Christopher Connelly as Jeff Marshall
Ken Lynch as Det. Hanson

References

External links

1971 television films
1971 films
Films set in San Francisco
1970s thriller films
American thriller television films
1970s English-language films
1970s American films